Ophioscolecida is an order of echinoderms belonging to the class Ophiuroidea.

Families:
 Ophiohelidae
 Ophioscolecidae

References

 
Ophiuroidea
Echinoderm orders